Elections to Herefordshire Council were held on 3 May 2007, along with the other local elections in England and Scotland. The entire council was up for election, with each successful candidate serving a four-year term of office, expiring in 2011. The Conservative Party gained a majority on the council, after seven years of the council being under no overall control.

Council Composition
Prior to the election the composition of the council was:

NL - No description

Ward Results
Asterisks denote incumbent Councillors seeking re-election. All results are listed below:

Aylestone

Backbury

Belmont

Bircher

Bringsty

Bromyard

Burghill, Holmer & Lyde

Castle

Central

Credenhill

Frome

Golden Cross with Weobley

Golden Valley North

Golden Valley South

Hagley

Hampton Court

Hollington

Cllr Dawe previously stood as an Independent candidate in 2003.

Hope End

Kerne Bridge

Kington Town

Ledbury

Leominster North

Leominster South

Llangarron

Mortimer

The single seat in this ward was uncontested. The incumbent Conservative Party candidate Lillian Olwyn Barnett remained as the councillor for this ward.

Old Gore

Pembridge and Lyonshall with Titley

References

2007
2007 English local elections
21st century in Herefordshire